Puzhakkal Block Panchayat is a major block panchayat in Thrissur taluk, Thrissur district  It is located  north of Thrissur city. It is named after Puzhakkal River that passes through this region.

The grama panchayats that constitute Puzhakkal Block Panchayat are:

Being one of the main blocks of the district, the block office is Puranattukara, Thrissur. As major revenue and business block and a residential area of Thrissur city in Kerala state, it is mostly either industrial and agricultural.

Economy
Now, it has become the most developed suburban area of Thrissur city. Many of the major nerve centres of Thrissur City, including the Thrissur Collectorate, Government Medical College Thrissur, Vilangan Hills, Kerala Institute of Local Administration (KILA), Amala Institute of Medical Sciences, Rashtriya Sanskrit Sansthan, Government Law College, Thrissur, Kendriya Vidyalaya, District Industries Centre of Kerala Govt., Ministry of Micro Small and Medium Enterprises under Government of India(MSME) and many more are in the block.

Many major automotive companies have commercial spaces here, including Hero Motors, Tata Motors, Fiat, Ford, Nissan, Hyundai, Toyota, Suzuki, Honda and more. A national-level tennis academy is also attracting tennis players here.

Industrial park
KINFRA is setting up an industrial park in Puzhakkal. The enterprises to be set up include units for ornaments, apparels and diamond cutting.

Puzhakkal Mobility Hub
A transit terminal Mobility hub also to be set up on lines of Puzhakkal Mobility Hub to reduce traffic congestion was recently approved to be realised soon.

References

Cities and towns in Thrissur district
Villages in Thrissur district